Lee Tai-lin (born 28 February 1985) is a Taiwanese football (soccer) player. He has played for Taiwan Power Company F.C. He is now serving military service and playing for National Sports Training Center football team.

External links

1985 births
Living people
Taiwan Power Company F.C. players
Taiwanese footballers
Chinese Taipei international footballers
Association football defenders